MZG or mzg may refer to:

 MZG, the IATA code for Penghu Airport, Huxi, Taiwan
 MZG, the station code for Muzaffargarh railway station, Pakistan
 mzg, the ISO 639-3 code for Monastic sign languages, Europe